The slaty bristlefront (Merulaxis ater) is a member of the Neotropical bird family Rhinocryptidae, the tapaculos. It is endemic to south-east Brazil.

Taxonomy and systematics

The slaty bristlefront and Stresemann's bristlefront (Merulaxis stresemanni) form a superspecies, and the two might actually be one species. It has no subspecies.

Description

A male weighed 
 and a female . The male is mostly dark blue gray. The lower back is dark brown and the flanks, vent, and tail are black. The female is over all shades of brown, lighter on the throat and breast. Both sexes have a crest of short stiff feathers that stand erect at the base of the bill and forehead.

Distribution and habitat

The slaty bristlefront is found only in southeastern Brazil, in a narrow band near the Atlantic coast from Espírito Santo south to Santa Catarina. It might have formerly occurred further north in southern Bahia.

The slaty bristlefront is a bird of humid forests in both lowlands and mountains.

Behavior

Feeding

Little is known about the slaty bristlefront's diet. It is known to forage in pairs, though not close together, on the ground and in low vegetation.

Breeding

One slaty bristlefront nest has been described, in Rio de Janeiro state. It was constructed by both members of a pair using twigs, narrow leaves, and leaf stems with a lining of lichen.

Vocalization

The slaty bristlefront begins its song with a series of clicks followed by a trill described as "hysterical laughter". It has several calls, described as 
“tsewk-tsewk, pit”, “keekick”, and “he-he-heeheeheehee”.

Status
The IUCN has assessed the slaty bristlefront as least concern. It is threatened by habitat loss, especially in the lowlands.

References

External links
Image at ADW
 

slaty bristlefront
Birds of the Atlantic Forest
Endemic birds of Brazil
slaty bristlefront
slaty bristlefront